Rapidiothrix is a genus from the family of Flammeovirgaceae with one known species (Rapidithrix thailandica). Rapidiothrix bacteria produces the antibiotics ariakemicin A and ariakemicin B.

References

Further reading 
 
 
 
 

Sphingobacteriia
Bacteria genera
Monotypic bacteria genera